Anna Ratkó (1903–1981), was a Hungarian politician (Communist). She was the Cabinet Minister of Health in 1950–1953.  She was the first female cabinet minister in Hungary.

References 

1903 births
1981 deaths
People from Nové Zámky District
People from the Kingdom of Hungary
Hungarians in Slovakia
Social Democratic Party of Hungary politicians
Hungarian Communist Party politicians
Members of the Hungarian Working People's Party
Government ministers of Hungary
Members of the National Assembly of Hungary (1945–1947)
Members of the National Assembly of Hungary (1947–1949)
Members of the National Assembly of Hungary (1949–1953)
Members of the National Assembly of Hungary (1953–1958)
Women government ministers of Hungary
20th-century Hungarian women politicians